Early Combinations is an album by a formative stage of the band which later became the Art Ensemble of Chicago. It was recorded in 1967 at Lester Bowie's home but not issued as a single CD until 2012 by Nessa Records. The two tracks on the album were originally included in the 1993 limited edition box set Art Ensemble 1967/68, also released by Nessa. "A To Ericka" was recorded for submission to a Jazz Festival in Poland and was unsuccessful in its purpose. "Quintet" was a dress rehearsal for a concert arranged by Jarman to take place at Winnetka High School that was cancelled.

Reception
The JazzTimes review by Mike Shanley notes that "It’s impressive how strong these two 20-minute-plus tracks sound, considering the group was not a proper unit at the time."

Track listing
 "A to Ericka" (Favors / Mitchell / Jarman) - 21:39 
 "Quintet" (Joseph Jarman) - 22:47

Personnel
Roscoe Mitchell - alto sax, soprano sax, clarinet, flute
Joseph Jarman - alto sax, sopranino sax, clarinet, flute, bassoon
Lester Bowie - trumpet, flugelhorn
Malachi Favors - bass
Charles Clark - bass on #1
Thurman Barker - drums

References

2012 albums
Art Ensemble of Chicago albums
Nessa Records albums